The Third World Women's Alliance (TWWA) was a revolutionary socialist women of color organization active in the United States from 1968 to 1980 that aimed at ending capitalism, racism, imperialism, and sexism. As one of the earliest groups advocating for an intersectional approach to women's oppression, members of the TWWA argued that women of color faced a "triple jeopardy" of race, gender, and class oppression. Though the organization's roots lay in the black civil rights movement, it soon broadened its focus to include women of color in the US and in developing nations.

History

The Third World Women's Alliance began in New York City as the Black Women's Liberation Committee (BWLC), which was a caucus of the Student Nonviolent Coordinating Committee (SNCC). Black women within SNCC, including Frances Beal, created the BWLC in 1968 to address the issue of male chauvinism within the anti-racism movement. In 1970 they renamed the group the Black Women's Alliance (BWA), becoming independent from SNCC but maintaining close political ties with it. Later that year, the group's common work and dialogue with Puerto Rican women transformed the BWA into the Third World Women's Alliance.

Cheryl Perry League (then Cheryl Johnson), who had been recruited into the New York TWWA chapter through friends connected to the Venceremos Brigade, established a second chapter in the Bay Area in 1971. The same year, the New York chapter began publishing the TWWA newspaper Triple Jeopardy, using it to stress the ideological connections between capitalist exploitation, global imperialism, and the oppression of women of color.  The first issue of Triple Jeopardy asserted that "the struggle against racism and imperialism must be waged simultaneously with the struggle for women's liberation" by "a strong independent socialist women's group".

The TWWA struggled internally with homophobia, and the West Coast branch lost several lesbian members. In contrast, the East Coast branch incorporated a position against heterosexism into its principles of struggle. They wrote in Triple Jeopardy:

The New York branch folded in 1977. In the same year, the Bay Area branch transformed itself into a mass activist organization, and began forming committees for external work. Committees formed during that period include the National Committee to Overturn the Bakke Decision, the Southern Africa Organizing Committee, the Josina Machel Committee and the Coalition to Fight Infant Mortality. By 1979 the TWWA re-organized to become the Alliance Against Women's Oppression (AAWO). The AAWO existed from 1980-1989, and then took new form again as the Women of Color Resource Center.

Contributions
The TWWA was one of several organizations formed by women of color in the late 1960s and early 1970s as responses to the essentialist theories of the early feminist movement. These organizations paved the way for Chicana feminism, Womanism, and Black feminism, among other theoretical approaches to feminism. TWWA broadened the scope of women's activism to address issues such as sterilization abuse, infant mortality, welfare rights, and low-wage work. Through its political activities, TWWA helped to create spaces in racial justice organizations for women's voices, issues and leadership. Although primarily an activist organization, concepts developed by TWWA's members in the course of political organization contributed much to feminist theory. TWWA's ideas of "double jeopardy" and "triple jeopardy" which were elaborated on by scholars as "simultaneity of oppression" and "both/and", advanced the understanding of the intersectionality of race, class, and gender in the women's movement. It also contributed to the experience of building "third world" and "black/brown" unity in opposing racism and sexism. The orientation of TWWA towards the "third world" brought the struggles, condition, and status of women in Latin America, Asia, Africa, and the Middle East to the forefront. TWWA built relations with women's organizations in other countries, pioneering a form of feminism that focuses on the effect of U.S. foreign and military policy on women's lives worldwide, promoting the idea that U.S. women of color had a role to play in the "global sisterhood".

References

External links
Third World Women's Alliance, Bay Area chapter records at the Sophia Smith Collection, Smith College Special Collections
Third World Women's Alliance, Encyclopedia of African-American Culture and History
Black Women's Manifesto
Digitized issues of Triple Jeopardy (1971-1975)

Women's rights organizations
African Americans' rights organizations